Lieutenant General Sir John Panton Kiszely,  (born 2 April 1948) is a retired senior British Army officer who was director general of the Defence Academy of the United Kingdom from 2005 to 2008. He is a former national president of The Royal British Legion.

Early life
The son of Dr John Kiszely and Mrs Kiszely, Kiszely was educated at Marlborough College and the Royal Military Academy Sandhurst before being commissioned into the Scots Guards as a second lieutenant on 20 December 1968.

Military career
Kiszely served with the regiment as a platoon commander, company commander and commanding officer in Great Britain, Northern Ireland, Germany, Cyprus and the Falkland Islands. Kiszely was awarded the Military Cross for an action during the Battle of Mount Tumbledown during the Falklands War, where he led an attack in close quarter battle against determined resistance through the Argentine position which drove them from the summit.

Kiszely became commanding officer of 1st Battalion the Scots Guards in 1986 and, following various other military appointments, took command of 7th Armoured Brigade in early 1993. In 1996 he was appointed General Officer Commanding 1st (UK) Armoured Division and served as commander of the Multi-National Division (South-West) in Bosnia.

In September 1998 Kiszely was appointed assistant chief of defence staff (resource and plans) at the Ministry of Defence. In 2002 he was appointed Commander of Regional Forces at Land Command and, in 2004, he was deployed as senior British military representative and deputy commanding general, Multinational Force, Iraq. In 2005 he took up his post as director general of the Defence Academy. He retired from this post on 30 May 2008.

Later life
On 14 December 2009, Kiszely gave evidence to The Iraq Inquiry in which he claimed that American officials had refused to admit that they were dealing with an insurgency in Iraq.

In December 2008, Kiszely was appointed national president of The Royal British Legion. He took over the role from Air Marshal Ian Macfadyen, who recommended him for the post. In an October 2012 article, the Sunday Times alleged that Kiszely was among several retired military leaders who had offered to lobby and influence MPs and government defence ministers on behalf of arms firms. When the Royal British Legion announced it was setting up an inquiry into Kiszely's behaviour, he resigned, admitting that he had made "exaggerated and foolish claims" and therefore it would be "inappropriate" for him to keep his role at the legion. However, he claimed that he had not broken Whitehall rules. Defence secretary Philip Hammond said that the allegations against Kiszely and others are damaging and that he may restrict the access that former officers have to current staff. "If they're abusing that access for commercial purposes then we will have to tighten it up or maybe even shut it down," he said. However, he argued that former military officers did not have influence on how the Ministry of Defence spends taxpayers' money. The Ministry of Defence said it would investigate whether Kiszely and other former generals implicated by the investigation had broken any rules and if so, what punishment was appropriate.

In 2017, Kiszely wrote the book, Anatomy of a Campaign: The British fiasco in Norway, 1940. It was published by the Cambridge University Press and won the inaugural Duke of Wellington Medal for Military History.

Family
Kiszely is married with three children.

References

|-

|-

|-
 

|-

|-

|-

 

1948 births
British Army lieutenant generals
British Army personnel of the Falklands War
Knights Commander of the Order of the Bath
Recipients of the Military Cross
Recipients of the Commendation for Valuable Service
Deputy Lieutenants of Gloucestershire
Foreign recipients of the Legion of Merit
People educated at Marlborough College
Living people
Scots Guards officers
Graduates of the Royal Military Academy Sandhurst
English people of Hungarian descent
Herschell family